Kilian Ignaz Dientzenhofer (1 September 1689 – 18 December 1751) was a Czech architect of the Baroque era.

Among Dientzenhofer's Prague buildings are the churches of Saint John of Nepomuk and Saint Nicholas, as well as the Vila Amerika and the Kinský Palace. He also built numerous churches and secular buildings in other towns of Bohemia. Many of his later projects were realized by his pupil and son-in-law Anselmo Martino Lurago.

Biography
He was the fifth son of the German architect Christoph Dientzenhofer and the Bohemian-German Maria Anna Aichbauer (née Lang), widow of the architect Johann Georg Achbauer the Elder, and a member of the well known Dientzenhofer family of architects. As an architect he co-operated with his father and with Jan Santini Aichel.

Projects

In Prague
 Vila Amerika, Nové Město (1717–1720), nowadays Antonín Dvořák museum
 Convent of Benedictine Břevnov Monastery (about 1717)
 St. John of Nepomuk Church in Hradčany, Kanovnická str. (1720–1728)
 Redesign of Loreta in Hradčany (1723)
 Baroque redesign of Church of St. Thomas in Malá Strana (1725–1731)
 Villa Portheimka in Smíchov, Štefánikova str. (1725)
 House By Two Turtle Doves, Nosticova 5 (1726)
 Church of St. John of Nepomuk, Vyšehradská str. (1730–1739)
 St. Bartholomew church in the Old Town (1731)
 St. Nicholas Church on Old Town Square (1732–1735)
 Church of Saints Cyril and Methodius, Resslova str. (1730–1740)
 Completion of St. Nicholas Church in Malá Strana (1737–1751)
 Goltz-Kinsky Palace on Old Town Square (1755–1765)
 Piccolomini Palace (Savarin), Na Příkopě 10 (1743–1751)

Outside of Prague
 Church of All Saints in Heřmánkovice (1722–1726)
 Church of St. Mary Magdalene in Karlovy Vary (1729–1730)
 Church of St. Lawrence in Chodov
 Ploskovice Castle
 Meziměstí Castle
 Church of St. Clement in Odolena Voda (1733–1735)
 Monastery of St. Wenceslaus in Broumov (1727–1735)
 Cistercian Monastery, Plasy (1739)

Literature 
 Milada Vilimkova, Johannes Brucker: Dientzenhofer. Eine bayerische Baumeisterfamilie in der Barockzeit. Rosenheimer Verlagshaus, 
 Allgemeine Deutsche Biographie, Bd. 3, S. 650-51
 Biographisches Lexikon zur Geschichte der böhmischen Länder, Band I., S. 247-248, 
 Hans Zimmer: Die Dientzenhofer. Ein bayerisches Baumeistergeschlecht in der Zeit des Barock. Rosenheim 1976
 Joachim Bahlcke u. a.: Handbuch der historischen Stätten Böhmen und Mähren, Kröner-Verlag, Stuttgart 1998, 
 Dehio-Handbuch der Kunstdenkmäler in Polen Schlesien, München / Berlin 2005, 
 Erhard Gorys: DuMont Kunst-Reiseführer Tschechische Republik, 
 Knaurs Kunstführer Tschechische Republik, 
 Tichy, Franz: Studie zu Sakralbauten des Kilian Ignaz Dientzenhofer. München 1996,

References

External links

 
 
 Prague Information Service
ADB entry

1689 births
1751 deaths
Architects from Prague
German Bohemian people
Czech people of German descent
Czech Baroque architects